Alphabet murders are a 1970s series of child murders in Rochester, New York, US

Alphabet murders may also refer to:

Crime
 California alphabet murders, a series of late-20th-century murder-rapes in California committed by Joseph Naso

Other uses
 The Alphabet Murders (poem), a 1976 poem by John Tranter
 The Alphabet Murders (film), a 1975 UK film based on the Agatha Christie story The ABC Murders

See also
 ABC Murders (disambiguation)
 The Alphabet Killer (film), a 2008 US horror film based on the 1970s New York alphabet murders